The following outline is provided as an overview of and topical guide to Cairo:

Cairo –

General reference 
 Pronunciation: (
 Common English name(s): Cairo
 Official English name(s): Cairo
 Adjectival(s): Cairene
 Demonym(s): Cairene

Geography of Cairo 

Geography of Cairo
 Cairo is:
 a city
 capital of Egypt
 Population of Cairo: 9,153,135 
 Area of Cairo: 606 km2 (234 sq mi)

Location of Cairo 

 Cairo is situated within the following regions:
 Northern Hemisphere and Eastern Hemisphere
 Africa (outline) 
 North Africa
 Sahara Desert
 Middle East
 Egypt (outline)
 Lower Egypt
 Cairo Governorate
 Greater Cairo
 Time zone(s): 
 Egypt Standard Time (UTC+02)
 In Summer: Egypt Daylight Time (UTC+03)

Environment of Cairo 

 Climate of Cairo

Natural geographic features of Cairo 
 Hills in Cairo
 Mokattam
 Islands in Cairo
 Gezira
 Roda Island
 Rivers in Cairo
 Nile
 World Heritage Sites in Cairo
 Islamic Cairo

Areas of Cairo 

 Coptic Cairo
 Downtown Cairo
 Islamic Cairo
 Old Cairo

Districts of Cairo 

 Azbakeya
 Bulaq
 Daher
 El Manial
 El Qobbah
 El Sakkakini
 Faggala
 Garden City
 Heliopolis
 Maadi
 Nasr City
 Shubra
 Zamalek
 Zeitoun

Neighbourhoods in Cairo 

 Abbassia

Locations in Cairo 
 Tourist attractions in Cairo
 Museums in Cairo
 Egyptian Museum
 Shopping areas and markets
 Qasaba of Radwan Bey
 World Heritage Sites in Cairo
Giza pyramid complex
Great Pyramid of Giza
Pyramid of Khafre
Pyramid of Menkaure
Great Sphinx of Giza

Ancient monuments in Cairo 

 Babylon Fortress
 Statue of Ramesses II

Bridges in Cairo 

 6th October Bridge
 Boulak Bridge
 Imbaba Bridge
 Qasr El Nil Bridge

Cultural and exhibition centres in Cairo 

 El Sawy Culture Wheel

Forts in Cairo 

 Cairo Citadel

Fountains in Cairo 

 Sabil-Kuttab of Katkhuda

Gates in Cairo 
Gates of Cairo
 Bab al-Futuh
 Bab al-Nasr
 Bab Zuweila

Monuments and memorials in Cairo 

 Emir Qurqumas Complex
 Mausoleum of Saad Zaghloul
 Unknown Soldier Memorial

Museums and art galleries in Cairo 

Museums in Cairo
 6th of October Panorama
 Bayt Al-Suhaymi
 Beit El-Umma
 Carriage Museum
 Coptic Museum
 Egyptian Geological Museum
 Egyptian Museum
Anubis Shrine
 Egyptian National Military Museum
 Gayer-Anderson Museum
 Gezira Center for Modern Art
 Mohamed Mahmoud Khalil Museum
 Mukhtar Museum
 Museum of Islamic Art, Cairo
 Museum of Islamic Ceramics
 National Museum of Egyptian Civilization
 Qasr Al-Eini Museum
 The Townhouse Gallery

Palaces and villas in Cairo 

 Abdeen Palace
 Al-Gawhara Palace
 Amir Alin Aq Palace
 Amir Taz Palace
 Baron Empain Palace
 Beshtak Palace
 Dubara Palace
 Gezirah Palace
 Heliopolis Palace
 Khairy Pasha Palace
 Koubbeh Palace
 Manial Palace and Museum
 Palace of Yashbak
 Prince Amr Ibrahim Palace
 Tahra Palace
 Tara
 Zaafarana palace

Parks and gardens in Cairo 

 Al-Azhar Park

Public squares in Cairo 

 Tahrir Square

Religious buildings in Cairo 

Mosques in Cairo
 Al-Azhar Mosque
 Al-Hakim Mosque
 All Saints' Cathedral
 Church of St. George
 Complex of Sultan al-Ashraf Qaytbay
 The Hanging Church
 Mashhad of Sayyida Ruqayya
 Mosque of Amr ibn al-As
 Mosque of Ibn Tulun
 Mosque of Muhammad Ali
 Muhammad Bek Abu El Dahab Complex
 Saint Mark's Coptic Orthodox Cathedral
 St. Peter and St. Paul's Church

Secular buildings in Cairo 

 Bank Misr Building
 Belmont Building
 Headquarters of the Arab League
 Khanqah of Baybars II
 Madrassa of Al-Nasir Muhammad
 Madrasa of Sarghatmish
 Maspero television building
 The Mogamma
 Qalawun complex
 Ramses Exchange
 Sabil-Kuttab of Katkhuda
 Sabil-Kuttab-Wakala of Sultan Qa'it Bay
 Sultan Al-Ghuri Complex
 Wakala al-Sultan Qaytbay
 Wikala of Al-Ghuri
 Yacoubian Building

Streets in Cairo 

 Muizz Street
 Qasr El Eyni Street
 Qasr El Nil Street
 Saliba Street
 Talaat Harb Street

Theatres in Cairo 

 Cairo Opera House

Towers in Cairo 

 Cairo Tower

Demographics of Cairo 

Demographics of Cairo

Government and politics of Cairo 

Politics of Cairo

 International relations of Cairo
 Twin towns and sister cities of Cairo

Law and order in Cairo 

 Law enforcement in Cairo
 Egyptian National Police

History of Cairo 

 
History of Cairo

History of Cairo, by period or event 

Timeline of Cairo

 Prehistory and origin of Cairo 
 The Romans establish a fortress town on the east bank of the Nile river (1st century)
 Medieval Cairo
 The town is conquered by the Muslims and the conquerors settle to the north of the Babylon Fortress, in an area that became known as Fustat (640 AD)
 The Fatimids found the city of Cairo in 969 as the new capital of the Fatimid caliphate in Egypt. The Caliph Al-Mu'izz li-Din Allah gives Cairo its present name, al-Qāhiratu (The Victorious) (973)
 Egypt's capital moves from Fustat to Cairo (1168)
 Saladin, the first Sultan of Egypt, establishes the Ayyubid dynasty, based in Cairo (1174)
 The Mamluks seize control of Egypt and the city becomes capital of the Mamluk Sultanate (1250)
 Cairo under the Ottoman rule
 Capture of Cairo. Cairo's political influence diminishes after the Ottomans supplant Mamluk power over Egypt (1517)
 Under the Ottomans, Cairo expands south and west from its center around the Citadel
 Modern Cairo (1863–present)
 British invasion (1882)
 Egypt's independence (1922)
 Egyptian revolution of 1952
 Egyptian revolution of 2011
 Plans are announced for a yet-unnamed city to be built further east of New Cairo, intended to serve as the new capital of Egypt (2015)

History of Cairo, by subject 

 Abdeen Palace incident of 1942
 Cairo fire
 Siege of Cairo

Culture of Cairo 

 

Culture of Cairo

Arts in Cairo

Architecture of Cairo 

 Buildings in Cairo
 Tallest buildings in Cairo
 Residential Architecture in Historic Cairo

Cinema of Cairo 

 Cairo Higher Institute of Cinema
 Cairo International Film Festival
34th Cairo International Film Festival

Music and dance of Cairo 

 Ballet of Cairo
 Cairo Contemporary Dance Center
 Cairo Opera Ballet Company
 Higher Institute of Ballet
 Music festivals and competitions in Cairo
 Cairo Congress of Arab Music
 Music schools in Cairo
 Arabic Oud House
 Cairo Conservatoire
 Music venues in Cairo
 Cairo Opera House
 Khedivial Opera House
 Musical ensembles in Cairo
 Cairo Symphony Orchestra
 Musicians from Cairo
 Gamal Abdel-Rahim
 Rageh Daoud
 Yusef Greiss

Visual arts of Cairo 

 Public art in Cairo
 Egypt's Renaissance
Cuisine of Cairo
 Ful medames
Events in Cairo
 Cairo International Book Fair
Languages of Cairo
 Egyptian Arabic
 Coptic
Media in Cairo
 Newspapers in Cairo
Al-Ahram
Egypt Today
 Radio and television in Cairo
 Egyptian Radio
People of Cairo
People from Cairo
 Boutros Boutros-Ghali
 Naguib Mahfouz
 Roland Moreno

Religion in Cairo 

Religion in Cairo
 Sunni Islam
 Oriental Orthodoxy
 Coptic Orthodox Church of Alexandria

Sports in Cairo 

Sports in Cairo
 Football in Cairo
 Association football in Cairo
 Cairo derby
Al Ahly SC
Zamalek SC
 Sports competitions in Cairo
 2006 Africa Cup of Nations
 2007 Pan Arab Games
 Rallye des Pharaons
 Sports venues in Cairo
 30 June Stadium
 Al Ahly Sports Hall
 Al-Salam Stadium
 Cairo International Stadium
 Cairo Military Academy Stadium
 Cairo Stadium Indoor Halls Complex
 El Marg Stadium

Economy and infrastructure of Cairo 

Economy of Cairo
 Companies in Cairo
Ghabbour Group
 Communications in Cairo
 Cairo Regional Internet Exchange
 Financial services in Cairo
 Banque du Caire
 Hotels and resorts in Cairo
 Cairo Marriott Hotel
 El Gezira Sheraton Hotel
 Fairmont Nile City
 Grand Nile Tower Hotel
 Marriott Mena House Hotel 
 Semiramis InterContinental Hotel
 Shepheard's Hotel
 Windsor Hotel
 Restaurants and cafés in Cairo
 Café Riche
 Shopping malls and markets in Cairo
 Khan el-Khalili
 Mall of Egypt
 Tiba Outlet Mall
 Tourism in Cairo
 Tourist attractions in Cairo
Giza pyramid complex

Transportation in Cairo 

Transport in Cairo
 Air transport in Cairo
 Airports in Cairo 
 Cairo International Airport
 Road transport in Cairo
 Buses in Cairo
 Roads in Cairo
Ring Road

Rail transport in Cairo 

Rail transport in Cairo
  Cairo Metro
 Lines
 Cairo Metro Line 1
 Cairo Metro Line 2
 Cairo Metro Line 3
Stations
Abbassia
El-Marg
 Railway stations in Cairo
 Ramses Station
 Trams in Greater Cairo

Education in Cairo 

Education in Cairo
 Libraries in Cairo
 Egyptian National Library and Archives
 Universities and colleges in Cairo
 Ain Shams University
 Cairo University
 French University of Egypt
 German University in Cairo
 October University for Modern Sciences and Arts
 Future University in Egypt

Healthcare in Cairo 

Healthcare in Cairo
 Hospitals in Cairo
 57357 Hospital
 Coptic Hospital
 Manshiet el Bakry Hospital
 Nile Badrawi Hospital
 Qasr El Eyni Hospital

See also 

 Outline of geography

References

External links 

Cairo
Cairo